"Dance On My Own" is a song by English recording trio M.O. It was released as a digital download on 22 August 2014 in the United Kingdom as the band's fifth single. Sampling the 2000s garage hit single "Flowers" by female duo Sweet Female Attitude, the song was co-written with Darren Martyn, who also produced the track alongside White N3rd and duo Loadstar.

Music video
A music video for "Dance On My Own" was directed by Carly Cussen and filmed on a multi story car park in Peckham, a district of south-east London. It was premiered on VEVO on 23 June 2014.

Track listing

Chart performance

Release history

References

2014 songs
2014 singles
M.O songs
UK garage songs